Eois fuscicosta is a moth in the  family Geometridae. It is found in Colombia.

References

Moths described in 1912
Eois
Moths of South America